Ishisaka (written: 石坂 lit. "stone hill") is a Japanese surname. Notable people with the surname include:

, Japanese footballer
Harry Kiyoshi Ishisaka (1927–1978), American aikidoka

See also
Ishizaka

Japanese-language surnames